Tang-e Ruin (also Romanized as Tang-e Rū’īn; also known as Tang-e Rūdeh) is a village in Mobarakabad Rural District, in the Central District of Qir and Karzin County, Fars Province, Iran. At the 2006 census, its population was 826, in 182 families.

References 

Populated places in Qir and Karzin County